Syed Fazl-ul-Hasan (1 January 1875 – 13 May 1951), known by his pen-name Hasrat Mohani, was an Indian activist, freedom fighter in the Indian independence movement  and a noted poet of the Urdu language.
He coined the notable slogan Inquilab Zindabad (translation of "Long live the revolution!") in 1921.
Together with Swami Kumaranand, he is regarded as the first person to demand complete independence for India in 1921 at the Ahmedabad Session of Congress. Maghfoor Ahmad Ajazi supported the complete independence motion demanded by Hasrat Mohani.

Biography 
He was born in 1875 [in many books it is written 1881 and 1880] as Syed Fazl-ul-Hasan at Mohan, a town in the Unnao district of United Provinces in British India. 

Hasrat was his pen name (takhallus) that he used in his Urdu poetry whereas his last name 'Mohani' refers to Mohan, his birthplace.

His ancestors migrated from Nishapur, in Iran.
 
Hasrat Mohani championed the freedom struggle. He also wrote verses expressing deep love for Krishna, and often went to Mathura to celebrate Krishna Janmashtami.

Education
He received his primary education at Kanpur Vernacular Middle School in Fatehpur Haswah, a town near Kanpur. He achieved a top position in Grade 8 in Uttar Pradesh, and then came first in Maths in Matric (Grade 10) exams. He received two scholarships, one from the government and the other from Muhammadan Anglo-Oriental College. He completed his BA in 1903 at Muhammadan Anglo-Oriental College which later became Aligarh Muslim University but before that he had been expelled from the college on three occasions for his criticism of the British government.  Some of his colleagues at Aligarh was Mohammad Ali Jouhar and Shaukat Ali. His teachers in poetry were Tasleem Lucknawi and Naseem Dehlvi. To honor him, Aligarh Muslim University has a hostel named after him.

Academic
A few of his books are Kulliyat-e-Hasrat Mohani (Collection of Hasrat Mohani's poetry), Sharh-e-Kalam-e-Ghalib (Explanation of Ghalib's poetry), Nukaat-e-Sukhan ( Important aspects of poetry), Mushahidaat-e-Zindaan (Observations in Prison), etc. A very popular ghazal Chupke Chupke Raat Din sung by Ghulam Ali and 'Ghazal King' Jagjit Singh was penned by him. He was also featured in the film Nikaah (1982). The famous slogan of Indian freedom fighters Inquilab Zindabad was coined by Mohani in 1921.

Political

Mohani was a member of the Indian National Congress for many years and also joined the All India Muslim League, serving as its president in 1919. He opposed the partition of India.  After the declaration of the Partition Plan on 3 June 1947, Mohani resigned as a member of the All India Muslim League and when the division of the country occurred, he chose to live in independent India. He became a member of the Constituent Assembly of India which drafted the Indian Constitution. To represent the remaining Indian Muslims on different platforms, Hasrat Mohani chose to live in India rather than migrate to Pakistan.

He never accepted Government allowances or stayed at official residences. Instead he stayed in mosques and used to go to the Parliament in a shared tonga. He was a religious practicing Muslim and led a simple life. Maulana had gone for Hajj (pilgrimage to Mecca, Saudi Arabia) several times. He used to travel in third-class railroad cars. When asked why he traveled third class, he quipped because there is no fourth class.

Struggle for Indian independence

Mohani participated in the struggle for Indian Independence (end of British Raj); and was jailed in 1903 for many years by British authorities. At that time political prisoners were treated like common criminals and forced to do manual labor.

In 1904, he joined the Indian National Congress Party.
He was the first person in Indian History who demanded 'Complete Independence' (Azadi-e-Kaamil) in 1921 as he presided over an annual session of All-India Muslim League. In December 1929, his campaign for 'complete independence' resulted in the shape of Indian National Congress session in Lahore.

Mohani opposed the partition of India. After complete independence from the British rule, Maulana Hasrat Mohani wanted a confederal set up on the pattern of Union of Soviet Socialist Republic (USSR). He wanted to see a confederal constitution in India after freedom from the British rule. His proposal had six federations: 1. East Pakistan; 2. West Pakistan; 3. Central India; 4. South-eastern India; 5. South-western India; and 6. Hyderabad Deccan.

Urdu-e-Mualla
He was also imprisoned for promoting anti-British ideas, especially for publishing an article against British policies in Egypt, in his magazine 'Urdu-e-Mualla'. Afterwards, unlike some Urdu poets like Josh Malihabadi and many Muslim leaders, he chose to live in India rather than move to Pakistan after independence (1947) to represent left over Indian Muslims on various platforms. In recognition for his efforts, he was made a member of the constituent assembly which drafted the Indian constitution. But unlike other members, he never signed it.

Communist movement
He was among the founders of the Communist Party of India at Kanpur in 1925.

Hasrat Mohani was deeply influenced by Russian revolution. His house in Kanpur was centre of preparations of the first all India Communist conference of December 1925. K.N. Joglekar wrote in his reminiscences that he and Bombay group came to know through VH Joshi, going to meet S. A. Dange in Kanpur jail, that Satya Bhakta, Hasrat Mohani and others were taking initiative to convene a communist conference in December 1925. Bombay group extended full support.

Hasrat Mohani was elected Chairman of Reception Committee (RC) of the conference. Hasrat Mohani was included in the Central Executive Committee elected at the conference. He was again included in CEC in 1927 extended meeting.

Hasrat Mohani later attended the foundation conference of Progressive Writers’ Association (PWA) in Lucknow in 1936.

Death and legacy
Maulana Hasrat Mohani died on 13 May 1951 in Lucknow, India.

Hasrat Mohani Memorial Society was founded by Maulana Nusrat Mohani in 1951. In Karachi, Sindh, Pakistan, the Hasrat Mohani Memorial Library and Hall was established by the Hasrat Mohani Memorial Library & Hall Trust. Every year, on his death anniversary, a memorial meeting is conducted by this Trust as well as many other organisations in India and Pakistan. Also Hasrat Mohani Colony, at Korangi Town in Karachi, Sindh, Pakistan, was named after Maulana Hasrat Mohani. A famous road is named after him in the financial hub of Karachi.

There is a Street Named Maulana Hasrat Mohani in Kadar Palace, Mumbra, Dist: Thane, Maharashtra.

Maulana Hasrat Mohani Hospital is situated in Chamanganj, Kanpur. There is also a road named Maulana Hasrat Mohani Street in Kanpur. Maulana Hasrat Mohani Gallery is situated at Bithoor Museum.

A hostel in Aligarh Muslim University is also named after him.

Publications
 Urdu-e-Moalla (magazine) (launched in July 1903) 
 Kulliyat-e-Hasrat Mohani (Collection of Hasrat Mohani's poetry) (Published in 1928 and 1943)
 Sharh-e-Kalam-e-Ghalib (Explanation of Ghalib's poetry)
 Nukaat-e-Sukhan (Important aspects of poetry)
 Tazkira-tul-Shuara (Essays on the Poets)
 Mushahidaat-e-Zindaan (Observations in the Prison)

See also
 Mawlānā

References

External links 

 http://www.hasratmohani.com 
 http://www.hasratmohanitrust.net
 Urdu Poetry of Hasrat Mohani
 Hasrat Mohani Ghazals
 The Maulana Who Loved Krishna
Profile of Maulana Hasrat Mohani - Archived

All India Muslim League members
Indian independence activists
Urdu-language poets
Aligarh Muslim University alumni
People from Lucknow
People from Unnao district
1875 births
1951 deaths
19th-century Indian Muslims
Members of the Constituent Assembly of India
Poets from Uttar Pradesh
20th-century Indian poets
19th-century Indian poets
Writers from Lucknow
Politicians from Lucknow
19th-century Indian politicians
20th-century Indian politicians
Indian people of Iranian descent